Rosevears is a locality and small rural community in the local government area of West Tamar, in the Western Tamar Valley region of Tasmania. The Tamar River forms the eastern and north-eastern boundaries. The 2016 census determined a population of 352 for the state suburb of Rosevears.

History
The locality is believed to be named for the Rosevear family, the original European settlers on the land.

Road infrastructure
The West Tamar Highway passes through the locality from south-east to north-west, and the C733 route (Rosevears Drive) runs from the highway along the river bank before rejoining it.

References

Localities of West Tamar Council
Towns in Tasmania